Psilocybe herrerae is a species of psilocybin mushroom in the family Hymenogastraceae. The mushroom was first described by Mexican mycologist Gastón Guzmán. It contains the compounds psilocybin and psilocin. Psilocybe herrerae is known only from the states of Chiapas and Veracruz, Mexico. It is in the Psilocybe fagicola complex with Psilocybe fagicola, Psilocybe oaxacana, Psilocybe banderillensis, Psilocybe columbiana, Psilocybe keralensis, Psilocybe neoxalapensis, and Psilocybe teofiloi.

See also
List of psilocybin mushrooms
List of Psilocybe species

References

Entheogens
Fungi described in 1978
Psychoactive fungi
herrerae
Psychedelic tryptamine carriers
Fungi of North America
Fungi of Mexico
Taxa named by Gastón Guzmán
Fungi without expected TNC conservation status